Saney Santos Sampaio, better known as Saney Sampaio (born January 24, 1976, in Cruz das Almas) is a Brazilian politician. He was president of Socialist Youth of the PDT in Maranhão (2001–2011) and general secretary of the National Union of Students (2003–2005).

References 

Living people
Democratic Labour Party (Brazil) politicians
Communist Party of Brazil politicians
1976 births